The Easter Island butterflyfish (Chaetodon litus) or white-tip butterflyfish, is a species of subtropical fish in the family Chaetodontidae.

Description
Butterflyfish have deep, laterally flattened bodies, a slightly upturned snout, uninterrupted dorsal fins and unforked, broadly wedge-shaped tail fins with flat ends. Chaetodon litus has a rectangular outline and is silvery-grey with white-edged scales. The dorsal fin has 13 spines and 23 to 25 soft rays while the anal fin has 3 spines and 19 or 20 soft rays.

Distribution and habitat
The Easter Island butterflyfish is native to the waters around Easter Island and is found nowhere else. Juvenile fish are sometimes found among corals in rock pools.

Biology
Juvenile Easter Island butterflyfish have been observed to act as cleaner fish, picking parasites off the skin of larger fish. During the breeding season, male and female adult fish form pair bonds.

The Easter Island butterflyfish is a bottom feeding fish. Examination of its stomach contents have shown that it feeds on polycheaete worms, shrimps, fish eggs and barnacles, and fragments of the black sponge Amphimedon sp. were also found. This was unexpected as butterfly fish are not known to feed on sponges, however the explanation may be that the sponge was ingested in error when the fish was feeding on the barnacles which had become entangled in the sponge.

Status
At one time this fish was listed as "Vulnerable" by the International Union for Conservation of Nature in their Red List of Threatened Species but in 2010, this was changed to being of "Least Concern". The reason given for this change was that, although its range was very limited, this fish was quite common within that range and did not face any significant threats. A small number of fish were collected for the reef aquarium trade but the number was not believed to reduce the population to any great extent.

References

Easter Island butterflyfish
Fish of Chile
Fish of the Pacific Ocean
Fauna of Easter Island
Easter Island butterflyfish
Taxonomy articles created by Polbot
Endemic fauna of Chile